Eleutherodactylus mariposa is a species of frog in the family Eleutherodactylidae endemic to Cuba.  Its natural habitat is subtropical or tropical moist lowland forest.
It is threatened by habitat loss.

References

mariposa
Amphibians described in 1992
Endemic fauna of Cuba
Amphibians of Cuba
Taxonomy articles created by Polbot